The German  (StGB) in section § 86a outlaws "use of symbols of unconstitutional organizations" outside the contexts of "art or science, research or teaching". The law does not name the individual symbols to be outlawed, and there is no official exhaustive list. However, the law has primarily been used to outlaw Fascist, Nazi, communist, Islamic extremist and Russian militarist symbols. The law was adopted during the Cold War and notably affected the Communist Party of Germany, which was banned as unconstitutional in 1956, the Socialist Reich Party (banned in 1952) and several small far-right parties.

The law prohibits the distribution or public use of symbols of unconstitutional groups—in particular, flags, insignia, uniforms, slogans and forms of greeting.

Text
The relevant excerpt of the German criminal code reads:

Symbols affected

The text of the law does not name the individual symbols to be outlawed, and there is no official exhaustive list. A symbol may be a flag, emblem, uniform, or a motto or greeting formula. The prohibition is not tied to the symbol itself but to its use in a context suggestive of association with outlawed organizations. Thus, the Swastika is outlawed if used in a context of völkisch ideology, while it is legitimate if used as a symbol of religious faith, particularly any South Eastern or East Asian religions.

Because of the law, German Neo-Nazis took to displaying modified symbols similar but not identical with those outlawed. In 1994, such symbols were declared equivalent to the ones they imitate ( § 2).

Affected by the law according to Federal Constitutional Court of Germany rulings are:
 (1952)
 (1956)

 (1982)
 (1983)
 (1992) (not to be confused with )
 (1992)
 (1994)
 (1995)
Blood and Honour, Germany chapter (2000)

Symbols known to fall under the law are:
the swastika as a symbol of the Nazi Party, prohibited in all variants, including mirrored, inverted etc. (exceptions are only applied to swastikas used as religious symbols in Hindu, Buddhist, and Jain temples)
a stylized Celtic cross, prohibited as a symbol of the VSBD/PdA and in the variant used by the White Power movement. The legal status of the symbol used in non-political contexts is uncertain, but non-political use is not acted upon in practice.
the solar cross as a symbol of the Ku Klux Klan (symbol of cross burning from the "second Klan" era onward), the German Faith Movement, the Thule Society and the 5th and 11th Waffen SS divisions
the Sig rune as used by the SS
the  emblem
 badges (2002)
: prohibited in the Third Reich version including a swastika.
the  greeting (1970)
the  greeting (1990)
The  with the Nazi swastika.
the hammer and sickle, red star and red flag when used as emblems of the Communist Party of Germany
The Black Standard of the Islamic State; widely considered the chief sigil or flag of the jihadi group.
 the People's Protection Units (YPG) pennant was explicitly banned as a symbol related to the PKK on 2 March 2017, even though the organisation itself is not currently recognised as terrorist.
Since the 2022 invasion of Ukraine by Russia, several states including Berlin, Lower Saxony and Bavaria are looking to put the military Z symbol under the law.

Illustration of the emblems mentioned in the list above:

Anti-fascist symbols
In 2005, a controversy was stirred about the question whether the paragraph should be taken to apply to the display of crossed-out swastikas as a symbol of anti-fascism. In late 2005 police raided the offices of the punk rock label and mail order store "Nix Gut Records" and confiscated merchandise depicting crossed-out swastikas and fists smashing swastikas. In 2006 the Stade police department started an inquiry against anti-fascist youths using a placard depicting a person dumping a swastika into a trashcan. The placard was displayed in opposition to the campaign of right-wing nationalist parties for local elections.

On Friday 17 March 2006, a member of the Bundestag, Claudia Roth, reported herself to the German police for displaying a crossed-out swastika in multiple demonstrations against Neo-Nazis and got the Bundestag to suspend her immunity from prosecution. She intended to show the absurdity of charging anti-fascists with using fascist symbols: "We don't need prosecution of non-violent young people engaging against right-wing extremism." On 15 March 2007, the Federal Court of Justice of Germany (Bundesgerichtshof) reversed the charge and held that the crossed-out symbols were "clearly directed against a revival of national-socialist endeavors", which thereby settled the dispute for the future.

Application to forms of media
Section 86a includes a social adequacy clause that allows the use of the symbols that fall within it for the purposes of "art or science, research or teaching". This generally allows these symbols to be used in literature, television shows (as with the 1960s Star Trek episode, Patterns of Force, itself allowed after 1995), films, and other works of art without censoring or modification and stay within the allowance for the clause. For example, German cinemas were allowed to screen Raiders of the Lost Ark and Inglourious Basterds, films which feature frequent displays of Nazi symbols, without censorship.

Up until 2018, video games were not included in the social adequacy clause. A High District Frankfurt Court ruling in 1998 over the video game Wolfenstein 3D determined that because video games do attract young players, "this could lead to them growing up with these symbols and insignias and thereby becoming used to them, which again could make them more vulnerable for ideological manipulation by national socialist ideas". This led to software developers and publishers to either avoid publication in Germany, or create alternative, non-offending symbols to replace them, such as in Wolfenstein II: The New Colossus, where the developer had to replace the game's representation of Adolf Hitler with a version without the moustache and named "Chancellor Heiler".

In August 2018, the German government reversed this ruling as a result of a ruling from April 2018. The web-based game  was released prior to the September 2017 elections, which included parodies of the candidates fighting each other; this included Alexander Gauland, who had a special move that involved Swastika imagery. When this was noticed by public authorities, they began prosecution of the game in December 2017, submitting it to the Public Prosecutor General's office for review based on the Wolfenstein 3D decision. The Attorney General declined to consider the game illegal under Section 86a, stating that the 1998 ruling was outdated; since then, USK had adopted age ratings for video games, and that there was no reason not to consider video games as art within the social adequacy clause. As a result, the Federal Department for Media Harmful to Young Persons adapted the Attorney General's ruling to be applicable for all video games within Germany, and subsequently the USK announced this change in August 2018; USK will still review all games to judge whether the use of imagery under Section 86a remains within the social adequacy clause and deny ratings to those that fail to meet this allowance. In August 2020, Through the Darkest of Times, in which players follow an anti-Nazi resistance group, became the first game permitted by USK to depict swastikas.

See also
 Censorship in Germany
 Bans on communist symbols
 Bans on fascist symbols
 List of symbols designated by the Anti-Defamation League as hate symbols in the United States
 Memory law
 Modern display of the Confederate flag
 Thor Steinar
 Verbotsgesetz 1947 in Austria

References

External links
Recht gegen Rechts: Symbole - strafbar oder erlaubt? 
Der Lehrerfreund: Rechtsradikale Symbole auf Jacke, Rucksack ... 
Hessisches Landeskriminalamt: Rechtsextremistischer Straftaten 
Collection of forbidden symbols

German criminal law
Anti-communism in Germany
Anti-fascism in Germany
Censorship in Germany
Nazi symbolism